Alifuru script is a writing system originating from Maluku, Indonesia. This script comes from the Alfur people culture and is generally only used to write in bahasa tana (a special language that is only used in traditional ceremonies).

History

The Alfur people in Maluku actually do not know the writing system and only know oral system and literature. The symbols in this script have similarities to the traditional symbols made by the Alfur people. But taking it and making it into a writing system is something new and unreferenced (Pattiiha, 2018). In form, it can be immediately known that this script is not a practical and efficient script to use in communicating, contrary to how a script should be created.

References

Maluku Islands
Indonesian scripts
Writing systems